The Douglas Cloudster was a 1920s American biplane aircraft. It was the only product of the Davis-Douglas Company, and was designed to make the first non-stop flight coast-to-coast across the United States.

Development
The Davis-Douglas Company was formed in July 1920 to enable Donald Douglas to design and build an aircraft capable of non-stop flight coast-to-coast across the United States. David R. Davis provided the financing for the company. The resulting aircraft was the Cloudster, a single-bay equal-span biplane of wooden construction. It was fabric-covered except for the forward fuselage, which was covered with sheet metal. The aircraft was powered by a 400 hp (298 kW) Liberty V-12 piston engine.

The Cloudster first flew on 24 February 1921, the aircraft broke the Pacific Coast altitude record by climbing 19,160 ft (5839 m) on 19 March that year, and attempted the coast-to-coast journey in June. The aircraft failed to make a non-stop journey due to engine failure, it had to make a forced landing at Fort Bliss, Texas on 27 June 1921. In 1923, the Cloudster was sold and modified for sightseeing flights, with two additional open cockpits and seats for five passengers replacing one of the fuel tanks. In 1925 it was again sold to T. Claude Ryan, who had it modified further by adding an enclosed cabin with ten seats, the aircraft became the flagship of Ryan's San Diego–to–Los Angeles airline, one of the first scheduled passenger lines in the country. It was subsequently used by a number of operators before it made a forced landing in shallow water off the coast of Ensenada, Baja California in December 1926. It was damaged beyond repair by the tide before it could be recovered, and it flew beer to Tijuana, Mexico.

Following the failure of the coast-to-coast flight, Davis lost interest and Douglas went on to form the Douglas Company (later the Douglas Aircraft Company) in July 1921.

1945 Cloudster II

Douglas Aircraft would revive the name in 1945 for a proposed  general aviation  aircraft with a pusher propeller, similar to the XB-42, as the Cloudster II.   The company's last effort in general aviation, it was not a success.

Specifications (Davis-Douglas Cloudster)

References

Notes

Bibliography
 The Illustrated Encyclopedia of Aircraft (Part Work 1982-1985), 1985, Orbis Publishing
 
 

1920s United States airliners
Cloudster
Single-engined tractor aircraft
Biplanes
Aircraft first flown in 1921